Anatomy of Restlessness was published in 1997 and is a collection of unpublished essays, articles, short stories, and travel tales. This collection spans the twenty years of Bruce Chatwin's career as a writer. This book was brought together by Jan Borm and Matthew Graves following the death of Chatwin in 1989.

External links 
*Richard Utz, Review of Anatomy of Restlessness (Prolepsis)

References 

British travel books
1997 short story collections
Short story collections by Bruce Chatwin
Books published posthumously
Jonathan Cape books
English non-fiction books